Maikon Jonathan Orellana Moran (born November 12, 1993) is a retired Salvadoran footballer who last played for Real Monarchs SLC in the USL.

Career

Professional
Orellana began his career with the Real Salt Lake AZ academy from 2010 to 2012 before joining Brøndby IF.  However, he left the club in 2014 without making a first team appearance.  He then joined Alianza where he made 15 appearances and tallied three goals before being released by the club in 2015.

On April 5, 2015, it was announced that Orellana joined USL club Real Monarchs SLC.  He made his debut for the club on April 25 in a 1–0 defeat to LA Galaxy II.

International
Orellana was a member of the Salvadoran under-20 squad that competed at the 2013 FIFA U-20 World Cup in Turkey.  He made his senior national team debut on October 10, 2014, in a 3–0 defeat to Colombia.

References

External links

1993 births
Living people
Salvadoran footballers
Salvadoran expatriate footballers
Brøndby IF players
Alianza F.C. footballers
Real Monarchs players
Association football forwards
Expatriate men's footballers in Denmark
Expatriate soccer players in the United States
USL Championship players
El Salvador international footballers